Seemed Like a Good Idea at the Time may refer to:

 Seemed Like a Good Idea at the Time (album), a compilation album by Al Stewart
 "Seemed Like a Good Idea at the Time" (song), a 2005 song by The Darkness